M. E. Sharpe, Inc., an academic publisher, was founded by Myron Sharpe in 1958 with the original purpose of publishing translations from Russian in the social sciences and humanities. These translations were published in a series of journals, the first of which was Problems of Economics, now called Problems of Economic Transition. In the 1960s, the translation project was expanded to include other European languages, then Chinese and later Japanese. Other academic journals launched by M.E. Sharpe during these years featured articles originating in English. At present, the firm publishes over 35 periodicals including Challenge: The Magazine of Economic Affairs, Journal of Management Information Systems, International Journal of Electronic Commerce, Journal of Post-Keynesian Economics and Problems of Post-Communism. Shortly after it was established, M. E. Sharpe, Inc. also began to publish scholarly books in the social sciences and humanities, with a special emphasis on international studies. In the 1980s, the book division was expanded and it currently publishes approximately 60 new titles a year, including works in economics, business, management, public administration, political science, history and literature. Many of M. E. Sharpe's textbooks are available in digital editions through the Sharpe E-Text Center.

Several Nobel Prize winners, including Kenzaburō Ōe and Wassily Leontief, are among M. E. Sharpe authors, as is the acclaimed American novelist Howard Fast, author of Spartacus.  The East Gate Books imprint is widely recognized as representing the best in Asian Studies.

In 1995, Sharpe Reference was founded to provide essential reference material for the high school, undergraduate, and general reader—again, building on Sharpe's areas of strength in American studies and global studies. The full, updated content of many of these reference sets is also available in electronic editions published by Sharpe Online Reference.

M. E. Sharpe, Inc. started in New York City and was originally called International Arts and Sciences Press.  After twelve years in the city, the firm moved to White Plains, New York. Its offices have been based in Armonk, New York, since 1980.

M. E. Sharpe was sold to Routledge in 2014.

Books 
M. E. Sharpe specializes in social sciences, humanities, business management and public administration.

Journals 
Some journals published by M.E. Sharpe include:
 Challenge: The Magazine of Economic Affairs
 European Education
 Problems of Post-Communism
 Journal of Economic Issues
 Journal of Management Information Systems
 Journal of Post Keynesian Economics
 International Journal of Political Economy

References

External links 
 

Academic publishing companies
Publishing companies of the United States
Publishing companies established in 1958
1958 establishments in New York (state)
Companies based in Westchester County, New York
2014 mergers and acquisitions